Athenogenes may refer to:

Athenogenes (fl. 320s BC), an Egyptian resident of Athens who was the subject of Hyperides' speech Against Athenogenes
Athenogenes of Pedachthoe (d. AD 303/4), Сhristian bishop and martyr of Pedachthoe from Sebastea
Athenogenes, a grandson of Gregory the Illuminator (d. c. 331)
Athenogenes of Petra (fl. c. AD 600), Christian bishop